Chechen may refer to:

Chechens, an ethnic group of the Caucasus
Chechen language, Northeast Caucasian language
Metopium brownei, also known as the chechen, chechem, or black poisonwood tree
Related to Chechnya (Chechen Republic), a republic within Russia
Related to the former Chechen Republic of Ichkeria

See also
 Ichkeria (disambiguation)

Language and nationality disambiguation pages